The tradition of carrying the Olympic flame from Olympia, Greece, the birthplace of the Ancient Olympic Games, to the host city of the modern Olympic Games via a torch relay was first introduced in 1936, ahead of the 1936 Summer Olympics. Since then, famous athletes (active or retired) with significant sporting achievements while representing the host country, promising young athletes, or other individuals with symbolic significance, have been selected as the last runners in the Olympic torch relay and consequently have the honor of lighting the Olympic cauldron at the opening ceremony.

History
The first well-known major athlete to light the cauldron was nine-time Olympic champion Paavo Nurmi at the 1952 Summer Olympics in Helsinki. Other famous final torch bearers include French football star Michel Platini (1992), heavyweight boxing champion Muhammad Ali (1996), Australian sprinter Cathy Freeman (2000), the Canadian ice hockey player Wayne Gretzky (2010), the marathon runner Vanderlei Cordeiro de Lima (2016) and the South Korean figure skating champion Yuna Kim (2018).

On other occasions, the people who lit the cauldron were not famous but nevertheless symbolized the Olympic ideals. Japanese runner Yoshinori Sakai was born in Hiroshima on August 6, 1945, the day the city was destroyed by an atomic bomb. He symbolized the rebirth of Japan after the Second World War when he lit the Olympic cauldron of the 1964 Summer Olympics. At the 1976 Summer Olympics in Montreal, two teenagers—representing the French- and the English-speaking parts of the country—symbolized the unity of Canada. Rafer Johnson became the first person of African descent to light the cauldron at the 1984 Summer Olympics. Norway's Crown Prince Haakon lit the cauldron of the 1994 Winter Olympics, in honor of his father and grandfather, both Olympians. For the 2012 Summer Olympics in London, seven aspiring young athletes—each nominated by a former British Olympic champion—had the honor of lighting the cauldron.

People who have lit the Olympic cauldron

Youth Olympics

See also
Olympic flame
List of Olympic torch relays

References

External links

Olympic flame
Olympic cauldron
Olympic cauldron
Olympics opening ceremonies